To be happy is to experience happiness: a feeling of contentment or joy.

Happy may also refer to:

Places 
 Happy, Arkansas, an unincorporated community
 Happy, Perry County, Kentucky, an unincorporated community
 Happy, Texas, a town
 Happy Isles, Yosemite National Park, California
 Happy Township, Graham County, Kansas

People
 Happy (nickname), a list of people
 Happy (video game player) (born 1991), French Counter-Strike player Vincent Cervoni Schopenhauer
 Happy Hall (born 1987), Bahamian international footballer
 Happy Hogan (baseball) (1877–1915), American baseball player
 Happy Jele (born 1987), South African footballer
 Happy Pieterse (1942–2013), South African boxer
 Happy Salma (born 1980), Indonesian actress, model and writer

Arts, entertainment, and media

Fictional characters
 Happy (dog actor), a dog in the TV series 7th Heaven
 Happy (manga character), a main character in the Japanese manga series Fairy Tail and Edens Zero
 Happy, the codename of the protagonist of the World War II film Decision Before Dawn, played by Oskar Werner
 Happy, one of the Seven Dwarfs, seen in children's story and Disney film Snow White and the Seven Dwarfs
 Happy, a snow hare in the animated series Tabaluga
 Mr. Happy, a Mr. Men character in Roger Hargreaves' children's book series and its television adaptation, The Mr. Men Show
 Happy Gilmore, from the film of the same name.
 Happy Walter Higgenbottom, a dog on the animated TV series The Mighty B!
 Happy Hogan (comics), a Marvel Comics Iron Man supporting character
 Happy Kyne, on the TV series Fernwood 2 Night
 Happy Lowman, a character on Kurt Sutter's FX series Sons of Anarchy and Mayans M.C.

Films
 Happy (1933 film), a British film
 Happy (2006 film), a Telugu film directed by A. Karunakaran
 Happy (2011 film), an American documentary directed by Roko Belic
 Happy (2015 film), a French film

Literature
 Happy! (sports manga), a sports manga by Naoki Urasawa
 Happy!, a comic-series by Grant Morrison, see Grant Morrison bibliography#Other US publishers
 Mr. Happy, a book title and its titular character, in Roger Hargreaves' children's book series and its television adaptation, The Mr. Men Show

Music

Bands
 Happy (band), a Japanese band formed in 2012

Albums
 Happy (Alexia album), or the title song (see below), 1999
 Happy (Matthew West album), or the title song, 2003
 Happy (Real Life album), or the title song, 1997
 Happy? (Jann Arden album), 1997
 Happy? (Public Image Ltd album), 1987
 Happy, by Sakurako Ohara, 2015

Songs
 "Happy" (Alexia song), 1999
 "Happy" (Ashanti song), 2002
 "Happy" (Ayiesha Woods song), 2006
 "Happy" (Bump of Chicken song), 2010
 "Happy" (Danny Elfman song), 2020
 "Happy" (Hog Heaven song), 1971
 "Happy" (Koharu Kusumi song), 2007
 "Happy" (Leona Lewis song), 2009
 "Happy" (Lighthouse Family song), 2002
 "Happy" (Marina and the Diamonds song), 2014
 "Happy" (Michael Jackson song), 1973; first recorded by Bobby Darin, 1972
 "Happy" (Pharrell Williams song), 2013
 "Happy" (Rolling Stones song), 1972
 "Happy" (Surface song), 1987
 "Happy" (Taeyeon song), 2020
 "Happy" (Travis song), 1997
 "Happy?" (Mudvayne song), 2005
 "Happy", by Alexandra Stan from Unlocked, 2014
 "Happy", by Best Coast from Crazy for You, 2010
 "Happy", by Brooke Candy, 2019
 "Happy", by Bruce Springsteen from Tracks, 1992
 "Happy", by The Carpenters from Horizon, 1975
 "Happy", by Fool's Garden from For Sale, 2000
 "Happy", by The Frames from Burn the Maps, 2004
 "Happy", by Hilary Duff from Dignity, 2007
 "Happy", by Jenny Lewis from Rabbit Fur Coat, 2006
 "Happy", by Julia Michaels from Inner Monologue Part 1, 2019
 "Happy", by Last Dinosaurs from Yumeno Garden, 2018
 "Happy", by Legacy of Sound, 1993
 "Happy", by Lit from A Place in the Sun, 1999
 "Happy", by Lolly from My First Album, 1999
 "Happy", by Mary Mary from Incredible, 2002
 "Happy", by Mazzy Star from Among My Swan, 1996
 "Happy", by Mitski from Puberty 2, 2016
 "Happy", by Natasha Bedingfield from Pocketful of Sunshine, 2007
 "Happy", by Ned's Atomic Dustbin from God Fodder, 1991
 "Happy", by Oh Wonder from No One Else Can Wear Your Crown, 2020
 "Happy", by Pink from Hurts 2B Human, 2019
 "Happy", by Public Image Ltd from 9, 1989
 "Happy", by Rick James from Throwin' Down, 1982
 "Happy", by Saving Jane from Girl Next Door, 2005
 "Happy", by Sister Hazel from ...Somewhere More Familiar, 1997
 "Happy", by Soul Asylum from Say What You Will, Clarence... Karl Sold the Truck, 1984
 "Happy", by Stabbing Westward from Stabbing Westward, 2001
 "Happy", by Steps from Tears on the Dancefloor, 2017
 "Happy", by Tracy Chapman from Let It Rain, 2002
 "(Don't It Make You) Happy", by Liz McClarnon in competition to represent United Kingdom in the Eurovision Song Contest 2007

Television
 Happy (1960 TV series), an American sitcom
 Happy! (TV series), a Syfy TV series (2017-2019), based on the comics of the same name by Grant Morrison
 Happy TV, a Serbian national television network

Brands and enterprises
 Happy Computers, a small company producing disk drive enhancements
 Happy n.v., the company that produces and sells the Happy Cube

Other uses
 Happy (fish), an informal name for a cichlid fish from the tribe Haplochromini, particularly in the aquarium hobby
 Happy the Elephant, an elephant at the Bronx Zoo in New York City that, in 2022, was legally ruled to be not a person
 Happy (software), a parser generator written in Haskell
 Happi or Happy, a traditional Japanese coat worn at festivals
 Happy, a mascot for McDonald's Happy Meal, first introduced in 2009 in France
 Happy Line, a monorail line in central Shenzhen, China

See also
 Happiness (disambiguation)
 Happy face (disambiguation)
 Happy, Happy (Norwegian: Sykt lykkelig), a 2010 Norwegian comedy film